Illoorfik Island (old spelling: Igdlôrfik) is a small, uninhabited island in Avannaata municipality in northwestern Greenland.

Geography 
Illoorfik Island is located in the southern part of Inussulik Bay, just off the northern coast of Nuussuaq Peninsula, in the northern part of Upernavik Archipelago.

References 

Uninhabited islands of Greenland
Inussulik Bay
Islands of the Upernavik Archipelago